Dorian Craig Auguiste (born 28 October 1980) is a Dominican-born former British Virgin Islands cricketer. Auguiste was a left-handed batsman who bowled right-arm off break.

In February 2008, the British Virgin Islands were invited to take part in the 2008 Stanford 20/20, whose matches held official Twenty20 status. Auguiste made a single appearance in the tournament against Dominica in a preliminary round defeat, with Auguiste being dismissed for 5 runs by Liam Sebastien.

References

External links
Dorian Auguiste at ESPNcricinfo
Dorian Auguiste at CricketArchive

1980 births
Living people
Dominica cricketers
British Virgin Islands cricketers
Dominica emigrants to the British Virgin Islands